Kielmansegg is the name of an old German noble family. Notable people with the surname include:
Count Erich Kielmansegg (1847–1923), Austrian statesman
Friedrich von Kielmansegg (1768–1851), German officer
Johann von Kielmansegg (1906–2006), German general staff officer
Sophia von Kielmansegg, Countess of Darlington (1675–1725), German-born courtier

See also
Marina Kielmann (born 1968), German former competitive figure skater

German-language surnames